The 1958–59 Nationalliga A season was the 21st season of the Nationalliga A, the top level of ice hockey in Switzerland. Eight teams participated in the league, and SC Bern won the championship.

Regular season

Relegation 
 EHC Arosa - HC La Chaux-de-Fonds 4:2

External links
 Championnat de Suisse 1958/59

Swiss
National League (ice hockey) seasons
1958–59 in Swiss ice hockey